Dul-e Elyas (also Romanized as Dūl-e Elyās) is a village in Howmeh-ye Sarpol Rural District, in the Central District of Sarpol-e Zahab County, Kermanshah Province, Iran. At the 2006 census, its population was 133, in 28 households.

References 

Populated places in Sarpol-e Zahab County